Beryozka or Berezka (both transliterated from Cyrillic Берёзка) may refer to
 Beryozka (Russian retail store)
 Beryozka (Russian dance troupe)
 Beryozka (Russian dance)
 Beryozka, Kursk Oblast, a village in Russia
 Beryozka, Vladimir Oblast, a settlement in Russia

See also 
Berezka, a village in Poland
 Beryozki, Volgograd Oblast